A Christian novel is a Christian literary novel which features Christian media genre conventions.

The tradition of Christian fiction
Christian novels are works of imaginative literature drawing on Christian themes, theology, and social norms. The European Christian literary tradition dates back centuries, and draws on past Christian allegorical literature, such as Dante Alighieri's Divine Comedy and John Bunyan's The Pilgrim's Progress and The Holy War. Twentieth century proponents of the Christian novel in English include J.R.R. Tolkien, G. K. Chesterton, C.S. Lewis, and Madeleine L'Engle. Aslan in Lewis' The Lion, the Witch and the Wardrobe allegorically represents Christ, for example, while L'Engle's A Live Coal in the Sea explicitly references the medieval allegorical poem Piers Plowman.

Many novels with Christian themes also fall into specific mainstream fiction genres. For example, J.R.R. Tolkien's The Lord of the Rings is viewed as mainstream fantasy, while Julian May's Galactic Milieu Series is viewed as mainstream science fiction, in spite of the references to the work of Jesuit priest Pierre Teilhard de Chardin. Similarly, G. K. Chesterton's Father Brown stories are mainstream detective fiction, even though the main character is a Catholic priest

Modern American Christian novels
In the last few centuries the existence of a conservative Christian subculture, particularly in North America, has given rise to a specific genre of Christian novel. Books such as Love Comes Softly by Janette Oke (1979) and This Present Darkness by Frank Peretti (1985), combining a specific brand of conservative Christian theology with a popular romance or thriller form, have gained approval in the subculture, just as in earlier times Ben-Hur: A Tale of the Christ helped make the novel acceptable to conservative religious people of the day. Publication of such Christian novels has increased greatly from this beginning, and excellence in the genre is now recognised by the Christy Awards, although an article in Christianity Today recently argued that such use of popular forms risks "foisting on the world impoverished—even laughable—expressions of those genres."

In North America, the Christian novel has evolved into a specific genre of its own, written explicitly by and for Christians of a particular type. Such a Christian novel does not have to involve an actual event or character in Bible history. A novel can be Christian in this sense merely because one of its characters either comes to a Christian understanding of God and of man's need for salvation from sin, or faces a crisis of his or her faith. Nor does the plot need to turn on whether any given character is a Christian or not—although many Christian novels do have plots that explicitly reference persecution (in the past, the present, or the future), Bible history, or unfulfilled prophecy (as in the immensely popular Left Behind series). Popular authors of Christian novels include Francine Rivers in the romance subgenre, and Ted Dekker and Robert Liparulo in the thriller/suspense subgenre.

Other authors of Christian novels include Karen Kingsbury, Judith McCoy Miller, Kristena Mears, Tracie Peterson, Bethany Kennedy Scanlon, Tosca Lee and Robert Whitlow. Some authors of Christian novels have received a mixed reception within the conservative Christian community. William P. Young's best-selling theological novel The Shack, for example, was strongly criticised by some reviewers.

Deborah Bryan of the Kansas Library Association suggests that this genre of books typically promotes values, teaches a lesson, always has a happy ending (good prevails over evil in all books), adheres to a decency code (certain boundaries such as sexuality, strong language, and topics of such cannot be crossed), and that Christian fiction is created for defined boundaries within a particular community. She also notes that a Christian fiction writer must comply with certain restraints such as:
Accept the truthful authority of the Bible 
Address dilemmas through faith in Jesus 
Believe that Jesus died and rose for sins of all people 
Avoid writing about certain “taboos”

Publishers of Christian novels include B&H Publishing Group, Baker Publishing Group (whose imprints include Baker Academic, Baker Books, Bethany House, Brazos Press, Chosen, and Revell), Bridge-Logos Foundation, David C. Cook, HarperCollins Christian (Thomas Nelson) and Zondervan, Harvest House, Howard Publishing (a division of Simon & Schuster), Kregel Publications, Tyndale House, and Waterbrook Press (a division of Random House). Such novels are today marketed world-wide through Christian bookstores and online distributors, such as ChristianBook.com and Amazon.com, respectively.

Urban Christian fiction

Urban Christian fiction is a genre in which conflicting stories of emotion and vividness mixes God, the urban church, and faith. Violence and sex is not purposely excluded, but are included whenever necessary for the story line. God is the center of the characters lives in Urban Christian Fiction and these stories usually portray African-American or Latino urban culture. Urban Christian publishing company publishes urban Christian books along with other subdivisions of urban Christian which includes urban renaissance and urban soul. Some best-selling authors in this genre for 2012 are Kimberla Lawson Roby, Victoria Christopher Murray, Tony Dungy, Lutishia Lovely, Neta Jackson, Keyon C. Polite, Serita Jakes (Bishop T.D. Jakes' wife), and ReShonda Tate Billingsley. Some book titles and authors of urban Christian fiction are: Married Strangers by Dwan Abrams, Sheena's Dream by Marilyn Mayo Anderson, First Comes Love by Shana Johnson Burton, Count It All Joy by Ashea Goldson, Secrets and Lies by Rhonda McKnight, 'Til Debt Do Us Part by Michelle Larks, and Soul Confessions by Monique Miller.

Some best-selling authors in this genre for 2015 are Jonathan Cahn,  (Karen Kingsbury),William Paul Young, (Sarah Price (author)),  and Francine Rivers. 

A Christian urban title that ventures into the Young Adult/SuperHero genre is "In the Shadows of Myrmidons" by B. Lloyd Reese and Nicholas J. Rzepczynski.
Urban Christian fiction is classified as part of the African-American Christian Market (AACM), where the hot-selling topics are fiction, books for dating, dramatic testimony, and single parenting. Prominent pastors of megachurches and leaders of powerful ministries contributes largely to AACM.
Baker Publishing Group is one publisher to make an authentic impact in publishing African-American authors of Christian fiction and religious materials.

See also

 Amish romance
 List of Christian fiction authors
 List of Christian novels
 Theological fiction

References

External links
Home of the Christy Awards

Christian literary genres